Shaybah ibn Rabīʿah (Arabic: شيبة بن ربيعة) was the brother of Utbah ibn Rabi'ah belonging to the clan of Banu Abd Shams (parent clan of Banu Umayyah) from the tribe of Quraysh of Mecca. He was also a champion of the Meccan army sent along with his brother Utbah and his nephew Walid ibn Utbah in the Battle of Badr in around 624 CE (2 AH).
In a three against three match before the actual battle began, he was killed by Ubaydah ibn al-Harith. Shayba married twice. First, he married with Fa'ra bint Harb ibn Umayya, Abū Ṣufyān ibn Ḥarb's sister. By her, he had children named Asim, Zaynab, and Ubayd-Allah. Second, he married with Umm Sharak (Safiyya) bint Waqdan from Banu Amir ibn Luayy. By her, he had children named Ramla, Fatima, and Aisha, who all would eventually become Muslim. Shayba remained pagan until his death at Badr.

Patriarchal Lineage
       Fahr (Quraysh)
          |
       Ghalib
          |
       Lu'awy
          |
       Ka'b
          |
       Murrah
          |
       Kilab
          |
       Qusayy
          |
 Abd Manaf Al-Mugheera
          |
       Abd Shams
          |
       Rabi'ah
       ___|
      |        |
    Utbah   Shaybah

Death

A tradition from Sunan Abi Daud that relates the incident at the Battle of Badr:

Narrated from Ali: Utbah ibn Rabi'ah came forward followed by his son and his brother and cried out: Who will be engaged in single combat? Some young men of the Ansar responded to his call. He asked: Who are you? They told him. He said: We do not want you; we, in fact, want only our cousins. Muhammad said, "Get up Hamzah. Get up Ali. Get up Ubaydah ibn al-Harith. Hamzah went forward to Utbah, I went forward to Shaybah; and after two blows had been exchanged between Ubaydah and al-Walid, they wounded one another severely; so we turned against al-Walid and killed him, and we carried Ubaydah away.

References

See also
 Banu Abd Shams
 Utba ibn Rabi'ah
 Battle of Badr
 List of battles of Muhammad

624 deaths
6th-century Arabs
7th-century Arabs
Banu Abd Shams
Year of birth unknown